Elizaveta Fedorovna Litvinova (1845–1919?) was a Russian mathematician and pedagogue. She is the author  of over 70 articles about mathematics education.

Early life and education
Born in 1845 in czarist Russia as Elizaveta Fedorovna Ivashkina, she completed her early education at a women's high school in Saint Petersburg. In 1866 Elizaveta married Viktor Litvinov, which, unlike Vladimir Kovalevsky (Sofia Kovalevskaya's husband), would not allow her to travel to Europe to study at the universities there. Thus, Litvinova started to study with Strannoliubskii, who had also privately tutored Kovalevskaya.

In 1872, as soon as her husband died, Litvinova went to Zürich and enrolled at a polytechnic institute. In 1873 the Russian czar decreed all Russian women studying in Zürich had to return to Russia or face the consequences. Litvinova was one of the few to ignore the decree and she remained to continue her studies, earning her baccalaureate in Zürich in 1876 and her doctoral degree in 1878 from the University of Bern.

Career and later life
When Litvinova returned to Russia, she was denied university appointments because she had defied the 1873 recall. She taught at a women's high school and supplemented her meager income by writing biographies of more famous mathematicians such as Kovalevskaya and Aristotle. After retiring, it is believed that Litvinova died during the Russian Revolution in 1919.

Bibliography
 A. H. Koblitz, Sofia Vasilevna Kovalevskaia in

External links
"Elizaveta Litvinova", Biographies of Women Mathematicians, Agnes Scott College

1845 births
1919 deaths
Russian mathematicians
Women mathematicians